Manon Bollegraf and Tom Nijssen were the defending champions but only Nijssen competed that year with Helena Suková.

Suková and Nijssen lost in the final 4–6, 6–3, 6–3 against Nicole Provis and Mark Woodforde.

Seeds
Champion seeds are indicated in bold text while text in italics indicates the round in which those seeds were eliminated.

Draw

Final

Top half

Bottom half

References
1992 US Open – Doubles draws and results at the International Tennis Federation

Mixed Doubles
US Open (tennis) by year – Mixed doubles